The second season of the sports entertainment reality competition series Australian Ninja Warrior premiered on 8 July 2018 on the Nine Network. The season was hosted by Rebecca Maddern, Ben Fordham & Freddie Flintoff.

Rounds

Episode 1

Heat 1

Episode 2

Heat 2

Episode 3

Heat 3

Episode 4

Heat 4

Episode 5

Heat 5

Episode 6

Heat 6

Episode 7

Semi-final 1

Episode 8

Semi-final 2

Episode 9

Semi-final 3

Episode 10

Semi-final 4

Episode 11

Grand final, stage 1

Episode 12

Grand final, stage 2

Obstacles by episode

Viewership

References

2018
2018 Australian television seasons